Peniarth 481D is a late 15th-century illuminated manuscript in its original binding that is held at the National Library of Wales. It is also known as The Battles of Alexander the Great, a reference to the twenty-six miniatures that accompany the Latin text . The volume also contains Disticha Catonis, and Historia trium Regum (History of the Three Kings). The manuscript, which is one of the most lavishly decorated in the National Library, has examples of the work of an English scribe, a Flemish illuminator and a workshop in Cologne.

References

National Library of Wales collections
Welsh manuscripts
15th-century illuminated manuscripts
Alexander Romance
Peniarth collection